Gilly is a municipality in Switzerland.

Gilly may also refer to:

Places 
 Gilly, Belgium, a section of the town of Charleroi
 Gilly (Charleroi Metro), an underground station

People

Surname 
 Adolfo Gilly (born 1928), Argentine-born Mexican author and professor of history and political science
 Charles Louis Gilly (1911–1970), American botanist
 David Gilly (1748–1808), German architect
 Dinh Gilly (1877–1940), French-Algerian operatic baritone and teacher
 Friedrich Gilly (1772–1800), German architect, son of David Gilly
 Hermann Gilly (1894–1944), German First World War flying ace and Second World War Luftwaffe officer
 William Stephen Gilly (1789–1855), English cleric and author

Given name 
 Gilly Flaherty (born 1991), female English footballer
 Gilly Flower (1908–2001), English actress
 Gilly Lane (born 1985), American squash player
 Gilly or Gelli Meyrick (1556–1601), Welsh supporter of Robert Devereux, 2nd Earl of Essex, and conspirator in Essex's rebellion
 Gilly Salmon (born 1949), English academic in the field of digital learning
 Gilly Szego (born 1932), British artist

Nickname 
 Gilly Campbell (1908–1973), American Major League Baseball catcher
 Gilly Coman (1955–2010), English actress
 Adam Gilchrist (born 1971), Australian former cricketer
 Gilly Reay (1887–1967), English first-class cricketer
 Gilly Williams (1719–1805), English Receiver-General of Excise, wit and letter writer

Characters 
 Title character of The Great Gilly Hopkins, a 1978 children's novel and film adaptation by Katherine Paterson
 Geillis "Gilly" Ramsey, heroine of Thornyhold, a 1988 fantasy novel by Mary Stewart
 Gilly Roach, on the soap opera Hollyoaks
 Gilly (Saturday Night Live), a recurring character in the television series
 Gilly (A Song of Ice and Fire), a character in George R. R. Martin's A Song of Ice and Fire novel series and Game of Thrones television series

See also 
 Gilley (disambiguation)
 Gillie (disambiguation)

Lists of people by nickname